Yves Crozet is a French economist and specialist in transport economics.

Biography 
Crozet is a professor in the Institut d'études politiques de Lyon (Sciences Po Lyon) and Lumière University Lyon 2. He was the president of the Laboratory of Transport Economics (LET) from 1997 to 2007, and the administrator of Réseau Ferré de France.

Distinctions 
On 18 April 2014, upon recommendation by the Ministry of Ecology, Crozet was awarded a Knighthood of France's Legion of Honour.

Selected publications 
 Analyse économique de l'État, Armand Colin, 1997
  Le territoire aménagé par les réseaux. Énergie, transports et télécommunications with Pierre Musso et Guy Joignaux, Éditions de l'Aube, 2002
 Réseaux, services et territoires – horizon 2020, with Pierre Musso, Éditions de l'Aube, 2003
  Les Grandes Questions de l'économie internationale, with René Sandretto, Lahsen Abdelmalki et Daniel Dufourt, Armand Colin, 2005
 Les Grandes Questions de la société française, with Dominique Bolliet et Jean Fleury, Armand Colin, 2005
  Le calcul économique : Dans le processus de choix collectif des investissements de transport with Joël Maurice, Economica, 2007
 Histoire des faits économiques contemporains, with Maurice Niveau, Presses Universitaires de France, 2010
 Hyper-mobilité et politiques publiques. Changer d'époque?, Economica, 2016

References

External links 
Biography page at LAET

Chevaliers of the Légion d'honneur
Fellows of the Econometric Society
21st-century  French economists
Living people
Year of birth missing (living people)
20th-century  French economists
Transport economists